Mordellistena ferruginoides is a beetle in the genus Mordellistena of the family Mordellidae. It was described in 1882 by Herbert Huntingdon Smith.

References

ferruginoides
Beetles described in 1882